Communication Research Reports is a quarterly peer-reviewed academic journal covering communication studies. It was established in 1984 and is published by Routledge.

The journal specializes in the publication of reports-style manuscripts using social scientific methods (such as quantitative data analysis). The most common type of manuscripts published are research reports, which often feature "scales, causal models, novel correlations, and immediate observations — constitute the 'nuts and bolts' of human communication..."

In 2016, the journal was rated as the third-most central to the field of human communication.

Since April 2019, the journal supports several of the open science initiatives sponsored by the Center for Open Science, including the use of badges on certain articles that allow readers unfettered access to research materials, sharing copies of study materials (questionnaires or stimulus materials used in experiments), as well as sharing data analysis files.

Abstracting and indexing
The journal is abstracted and indexed in EBSCO databases, PsycINFO, and Scopus.

Editors-in-chief 
The founding editor-in-chief of the journal was James C. McCroskey (Pennsylvania State University). At the April 2019 meeting of the Eastern Communication Association, Keith Weber (Chapman University) was named as the editor-elect and will edit vols. 37-39.

Past editors

References

External links

Routledge academic journals
Quarterly journals
English-language journals
Communication journals
Publications established in 1984